Mauro Gabriel Osores (born 20 February 1997) is an Argentine professional footballer who plays as a centre-back for Atlético de Rafaela, on loan from Atlético Tucumán.

Career
Osores started his career with Lastenia in 2015, playing nine times in Torneo Federal B. He then joined Argentine Primera División side Atlético Tucumán in 2016. Osores first appeared in the club's first-team in 2017, making the substitutes bench for a Copa Sudamericana first leg with Oriente Petrolero in Bolivia on 11 July. He made his professional debut in the second leg, playing the full match in a 3–0 win at the Estadio Monumental José Fierro. On 11 November, Osores made his second appearance in a Copa Argentina victory versus Rosario Central. He appeared three more times for them in 2017–18.

In July 2019, Osores headed out on loan to Primera B Nacional with Guillermo Brown. His debut came in August against Barracas Central, with the defender scoring on his next appearance on 4 October versus Estudiantes. He'd appear in two more matches for the club, before returning to his parent club during the COVID-19 pandemic.

In February 2022, Osores moved to Central Norte on a one-year loan deal. However, the loan at Central Norte was terminated and replaced with a loan deal with Atletico de Rafaela instead, as on 10 June 2022, Osores signed a deal with the club until 31 December 2023.Atlético de Rafaela

Career statistics
.

References

External links

1997 births
Living people
Sportspeople from Tucumán Province
Argentine footballers
Association football defenders
Argentine Primera División players
Primera Nacional players
Atlético Tucumán footballers
Guillermo Brown footballers
Central Norte players
Atlético de Rafaela footballers